The MT Timofey Guzhenko is a Russian double acting shuttle tanker operated by Sovcomflot.

The ship is named after Timofey Guzhenko (1918–2008), the USSR Minister of Merchant Marine in 1970–1986 and one of the founders of the Sovcomflot Group. He was also the leader of the first expedition to reach the North Pole on board a surface ship, the nuclear-powered icebreaker Arktika, on 17 August 1977.

Sister ships
Vasily Dinkov (delivered 2007)
Kapitan Gotskiy (delivered 2008)

References

External links

2008 ships
Tankers of Russia
Double acting ships